The Reynard 92D is an open-wheel formula race car, designed and developed by Malcolm Oastler, and constructed and built by Reynard Motorsport, for use in Formula 3000 categories, Formula Nippon, and Formula Holden racing series', in 1992.

References 

Open wheel racing cars
International Formula 3000
Reynard Motorsport vehicles